Johnsons Strawberry Farm Airport  is a private-use airport located three miles (5 km) northeast of the central business district of Hobart, a city in Lake County, Indiana, United States. This airport is privately owned by Rodney Johnson.

Facilities 
Johnsons Strawberry Farm Airport has one runway:
 Runway 18/36: 2,000 x 60 ft. (610 x 18 m), Surface: Turf

References

External links 

Airports in Lake County, Indiana